Nico Ingo Rinderknecht (born 11 October 1997) is a German footballer who plays as a defensive midfielder for Bayernliga club SV Donaustauf.

Club career
Rinderknecht made his Bundesliga debut on 13 December 2015 against Borussia Dortmund replacing David Abraham after 85 minutes in a 4–1 away defeat.

Honours
Regionalliga Bayern: 2019–21

References

External links
 
 

1997 births
Living people
Sportspeople from Giessen
Footballers from Hesse
Association football midfielders
German footballers
Eintracht Frankfurt players
FC Ingolstadt 04 players
FC Ingolstadt 04 II players
SC Preußen Münster players
FC Gießen players
1. FC Schweinfurt 05 players
Bundesliga players
3. Liga players
Regionalliga players
Bayernliga players